Marek Zsigmund (born 20 April 1997) is a Slovak professional footballer who plays for Ružomberok as a midfielder.

Club career

MFK Ružomberok
Zsigmund made his Fortuna Liga debut for Ružomberok against iClinic Sereď on 6 April 2019, in a 0:1 away win. In the match, he replaced Štefan Gerec in stoppage time.

References

External links
 MFK Ružomberok official profile 
 Futbalnet profile 
 
 

1997 births
Living people
Sportspeople from Ružomberok
Slovak footballers
Slovakia youth international footballers
Association football midfielders
MFK Ružomberok players
ŠKM Liptovský Hrádok players
3. Liga (Slovakia) players
Slovak Super Liga players
2. Liga (Slovakia) players